The Computing Community Consortium (CCC) is a programmatic committee of the Computing Research Association. Its stated mission is "...to catalyze the computing research community and enable the pursuit of innovative, high-impact research".

The CCC conducts activities that strengthen the research community, articulate compelling research visions, and align those visions with pressing national and global challenges. The CCC communicates the importance of those visions to policymakers, government and industry stakeholders, the public, and the research community itself.

History
In March 2006, the National Science Foundation (NSF) issued a solicitation indicating its desire to establish a Computing Community Consortium. In October of that year, CRA responded to the solicitation, submitting a proposal that was backed by explicit letters of support from 132 Ph.D.-granting academic programs, 16 leading corporations, 7 major national laboratories and research centers, and five professional societies in the field. Pursuant to positive external peer review, the CCC was established in late 2006 through a cooperative agreement between NSF and CRA.

An interim CCC Council was appointed by the proposal team in December 2006. Following an open recruitment process, Ed Lazowska (University of Washington) was selected as Chair of the CCC Council in March 2007. The membership of the inaugural CCC Council was selected through a transparent process and announced in June 2007. The first public activity of the CCC was a set of five plenary talks at the Federated Computing Research Conference (FCRC 2007) that month.

Early on, CCC Council member Susan Graham assumed the role of Vice Chair. Andrew Bernat, CRA's Executive Director, served the CCC in the role of staff Director until Erwin Gianchandani was recruited as full-time staff Director in April 2010. Ann Drobnis took over as Director in March 2013.

Current Structure
Today, the CCC Council has 20 members on 3-year staggered terms, representing the diverse nature of the computing research field. Liz Bradley serves as chair and Dan Lopresti serves as vice-chair.

The CCC operates as a programmatic committee of CRA under CRA's bylaws: its membership only slightly overlaps the CRA's board of directors; it has significant autonomy, and it has a great deal of synergistic mutual benefit with CRA. The CCC Council meets three times every calendar year, including at least one meeting in Washington, D.C., and has biweekly conference calls between these meetings. Also, the CCC leadership has biweekly conference calls with the leadership of NSF's Directorate for Computer and Information Science and Engineering (CISE).

The CCC is broadly inclusive, and any computing researcher who wishes to become involved is encouraged to do so. For example, each winter, the CCC issues a call for nominations for Council members effective the following July.

References

Research organizations in the United States
Computer science organizations